A list of films produced in France in 1912.

See also
 1912 in France

External links
 French films of 1912 at the Internet Movie Database

1912
Lists of 1912 films by country or language
Films